Marisa T. Darden is an American lawyer who was confirmed to serve as United States attorney for the Northern District of Ohio but later withdrew from the position.

Education 

Darden earned a Bachelor of Arts from the University of Michigan in 2005 and a Juris Doctor from the Duke University School of Law.

Career 

In 2010 and 2011, Darden served as a law clerk for Judge Morrison C. England Jr. From 2011 to 2014, she was an assistant district attorney in the New York County District Attorney's Office. From 2014 to 2019, she served as assistant United States attorney in the United States Attorney's Office for the Northern District of Ohio. Since 2019, she has worked as a principal at Squire Patton Boggs in Cleveland.

Nomination as U.S. attorney 
On November 12, 2021, President Joe Biden announced his intent to nominate Darden to be the United States attorney for the Northern District of Ohio. On November 15, 2021, her nomination was sent to the United States Senate. On February 10, 2022, her nomination was reported out of committee by a voice vote. On April 27, 2022, her nomination was confirmed in the Senate by voice vote. On May 17, 2022, despite being confirmed by the Senate, Darden withdrew her name from consideration for position as U.S. attorney, citing her family. She will return to private practice.

Controversies 

It is alleged that in September 2017, ex-DEA agent Jose Irizarry saw Marisa Darden at a gathering where he witnessed two DEA agents taking ecstasy. Irizarry says he didn't see Darden taking drugs. (At least one DEA agent who attended has been placed on administrative leave.)  Darden refused to answer questions from AP but her attorney said in a statement that she “cooperated fully” with the federal investigation into “alleged illegal activity by federal agents,” an inquiry separate from the FBI background check she faced in the confirmation process. “There is no evidence that she participated in any illegal activity,” Darden's attorney, James Wooley, wrote in an email to AP.

References 

Living people
Assistant United States Attorneys
Duke University School of Law alumni
Ohio lawyers
University of Michigan alumni
Year of birth missing (living people)
People associated with Squire Patton Boggs